Kittisak Rawangpa (born January 3, 1975) is a Thai former footballer. He also played for the Thailand national football team 1997–2010.

International career
On the back of performing extremely well in the Thailand Premier League, Kittisak was called up to the full national side in coach Peter Reid's first squad announcement. He was called up with 35 other players to the 2008 T&T Cup hosted by Vietnam.

Kittisak was a member of the victorious T&T Cup 2008 winning squad.

He appeared for Thailand in eleven qualifying matches for the 2002 FIFA World Cup.

Honours

Player

International
Thailand
 Asian Games Fourth place (1); 2002
 ASEAN Football Championship  Champion (2); 2000, 2002 
Runners-up 2007, 2008
 Sea Games   Gold Medal (1); 1997
 T&T Cup  Winner (1); 2008
 Queen's Cup   Winner (1); 2010

References

External links

1975 births
Living people
Kittisak Rawangpa
Kittisak Rawangpa
2000 AFC Asian Cup players
Kittisak Rawangpa
Kittisak Rawangpa
Kittisak Rawangpa
Kittisak Rawangpa
Kittisak Rawangpa
Expatriate footballers in Vietnam
Kittisak Rawangpa
Kittisak Rawangpa
Association football goalkeepers
Footballers at the 2002 Asian Games
Southeast Asian Games medalists in football
Kittisak Rawangpa
Competitors at the 1997 Southeast Asian Games
Kittisak Rawangpa
Thai expatriate sportspeople in Vietnam